is a 2023 Japanese anime television series set in the universe of Trails, a video game franchise by Nihon Falcom. It is produced by Tatsunoko Production and premiered in January. The series is dubbed in English and licensed by Crunchyroll.

A mobile game by UserJoy Technology, featuring an original story with the anime's original cast, is planned to be released later in 2023.

Premise
The Legend of Heroes: Trails of Cold Steel – Northern War depicts the Northern War, a conflict between the Erebonian Empire and the North Ambria State, and placed during the time skip between the video games Trails of Cold Steel II and III. It follows Lavian Winslet, a girl born in North Ambria, a poor country in the northwest of Zemurian continent. She enlists in the Northern Jaegers, the largest mercenary corps in Zemuria to protect her hometown, while distinguishing herself from her grandfather, Vlad, the renounced hero who betrayed their country. Prior to the start of the anime, Lavian assembles a platoon with Martin S. Robinson, Iseria Frost and Talion Drake for a secret mission to Erebonia, an imperialistic country to the south, to gather information about the "Imperial Hero" whose existence spells a threat to their country.

Characters

Episode list

Notes

References

External links

 

2023 anime television series debuts
Anime television series based on video games
Crunchyroll anime
Tatsunoko Production
The Legend of Heroes
Trails (series)
Tokyo MX original programming